Michael or Mike Norris may refer to:
 Michael Norris (footballer), Australian football player
 Michael Norris (politician), American politician
 Mike Norris (actor) (born 1963), American actor
 Mike Norris (baseball) (born 1955), American baseball player
 Mike Norris (businessman), chief executive officer of Computacenter plc
 Mike Norris (football manager), English football manager

See also
Michael Morris (disambiguation)
Michael Dorris